Pityrodia salvifolia is a flowering plant in the mint family Lamiaceae and is endemic to Queensland. It is an erect, spreading shrub with aromatic, wrinkled or corrugated leaves and clusters of small flowers with white petals. It is mostly found in wet forests in coastal north Queensland.

Description
The petals form a bell-shaped tube with three lobes slightly larger than the other two. There are four stamens, with two slightly longer than the other pair, the longer pair about the same length or slightly shorter than the petal tube. The fruit is a hairy, oval-shaped capsule with the sepals attached.

Taxonomy and naming
Pityrodia salvifolia was first formally described in 1810 by Robert Brown and the description was published in the Prodromus Florae Novae Hollandiae et Insulae Van Diemen. The specific epithet (salvifolia) is derived from the Latin words salvia meaning "sage" and -folium meaning "-leaved".

Distribution and habitat
This pityrodia mostly occurs between Bundaberg and Cairns where it mostly grows in wet forest, sometimes in or near rainforest.

References

 

salvifolia
Plants described in 1810
Flora of Queensland